Seven Sages may refer to:
 Saptarishi or Seven Sages of ancient India
 Seven Sages of Greece, seven early 6th century BC philosophers, statesmen and law-givers
 Seven Sages of Rome, a medieval legend of Persian origin
 Apkallu, the Seven Sages in Ancient Mesopotamian tradition
 Seven Sages of the Bamboo Grove in China
 Seven Wise Masters, a cycle of medieval stories
 Seven Sages, an antagonist group in Pokémon Black and White
 Seven Sages (Zelda series), various characters in the Legend of Zelda series
 Seven Sages, an antagonist organization in Hyperdimension Neptunia Victory

See also 
 Wise old man
 Sage (disambiguation)